Luciosoma setigerum is a species of cyprinid fish found on the Malay peninsula.

References

Luciosoma
Danios
Fish described in 1842